Clelandella azorica is a species of sea snail, a marine gastropod mollusk in the family Trochidae, the top snails.

Description
The size of the shell varies between 9 mm and 12.5 mm.

Distribution
This species occurs in the Atlantic Ocean off the Azores.

References

External links
 
 Gofas S. (2005). Geographical differentiation in Clelandella (Gastropoda: Trochidae) in the northeastern Atlantic. Journal of Molluscan Studies 71: 133–144 page(s): 139-140

azorica
Gastropods described in 2005